Cameron Ciraldo (born 30 October 1984) is an Australian professional rugby league football coach who is the head coach of the Canterbury-Bankstown Bulldogs in the NRL, and a former professional rugby league footballer. He is known as the defensive coach behind the Penrith Panthers back-to-back premierships in 2021 and 2022. He was previously the head coach of the Italy national team and an assistant coach of the Penrith Panthers in the National Rugby League. During his playing career, Ciraldo played for the Cronulla-Sutherland Sharks, Newcastle Knights and the Penrith Panthers, all in the NRL, and was selected to represent Italy.

Early life
Ciraldo was born in Sydney, New South Wales, Australia to parents Nick and Kelly Ciraldo. He is of Italian descent through his grandmother, who migrated from Italy as a child. He completed his schooling at Menai High School class of 2002.

Playing career
Ciraldo made his NRL debut for the Cronulla-Sutherland Sharks on 5 August 2005 in their round 22 game against the Melbourne Storm at Endeavour Field.

Ciraldo signed a two-year deal with Newcastle on 19 October 2007. On 23 March 2009, he broke his fibula in four places and dislocated his ankle while playing against Cronulla-Sutherland at Toyota Stadium.  He was escorted from the field with his ankle rotated at approximately 90 degrees; the injury was described as "one of the most sickening injuries on a football field". On 10 September 2009, Ciraldo re-signed with Newcastle on a two-year deal.

On 17 August 2011, Ciraldo signed a two-year deal with the Penrith Panthers. He played for the Windsor Wolves, Penrith's feeder team, in their 8-36 loss to the Cronulla-Sutherland Sharks in the 2013 NSW Cup Grand Final on 6 October 2013.

Ciraldo retired at the end of the 2013 NRL season.

Representative career
In October 2009, Ciraldo represented Italy in the Australian Mediterranean (Aus-Med) Shield at Marconi Stadium in Sydney, a tournament made up completely of Australian residents, such as Blake Austin, John Skandalis and Jarrod Sammut. Italy's match against Malta was Ciraldo's first time taking the field since breaking his leg in March 2009. Ciraldo was named in the Italian squad for the 2009 European Cup, also held in October, but was unable to attend due to scheduling conflicts.

In April 2011, Ciraldo was named as vice-captain for Italy in their 2013 World Cup qualifying campaign in October 2011. He made his Test debut against Russia on 15 October 2011, scoring a try in Italy's 92-6 win. He played in all three of Italy's matches. For the 2013 Rugby League World Cup, Ciraldo was again named as vice-captain of the team. He played in Italy's 15-14 upset over England in their pre-tournament friendly match, and featured in all three of their World Cup group matches, scoring a try in their game against Scotland.

Coaching career
Following his retirement from his playing career, Ciraldo became the assistant coach of the Penrith Panthers' NYC team in 2014, under head coach Trent Barrett. On 5 April 2014, Ciraldo was appointed as assistant coach of the Italy national team, also under head coach Barrett.

Ciraldo was promoted to head coach of Penrith's NYC team in 2015. That year, his team won 20 of their 24 regular season games to claim the minor premiership, before going on to win the Grand Final. The following year, the team won 18 of their 24 regular season games (in addition to 2 draws) to claim the minor premiership for the second consecutive year. However, they were unsuccessful in winning back-to-back premierships, losing 30-28 to the Sydney Roosters after leading 28-6 at halftime. Ciraldo was named as coach in the NYC Team of the Year in both 2015 and 2016.

In May 2016, Ciraldo was named as head coach of the Italy national team. Assistant coach Leo Epifania mentored the team during their 2016 Mediterranean Cup match against Lebanon in June, but Ciraldo returned as head coach for their 2017 Rugby League World Cup qualifying matches in October 2016. The Italian team defeated Russia in the repechage round to qualify for the 2017 World Cup.

In 2017, Ciraldo was promoted to assistant coach of Penrith's NRL team to work under head coach Anthony Griffin. In August 2018, Ciraldo was promoted to caretaker coach following Griffin's sacking as head coach.
Ciraldo guided Penrith to a 5th place finish and the club qualified for the finals.  In week one, Penrith defeated New Zealand to set up an elimination final against Cronulla.  Cronulla went on to win the match 21-20.  In October 2018, Ciraldo was replaced as head coach by Ivan Cleary with Ciraldo dropping back to an assistant coach role at Penrith.

Ciraldo was the assistant coach in the 2020 NRL Grand Final before winning the premiership in 2021. 

On the 14th of August, 2022 the Bulldogs announced that Ciraldo would join the club as head coach on a five-year arrangement from 2023 onwards. Ciraldo will join Penrith Panthers premiership winners Matt Burton and Viliame Kikau at Belmore, a team whom he was responsible for their defence. Ciraldo enjoyed an extensive relationship with Canterbury general manager Phil Gould who promoted him into his first coaching roles.

Personal life
Ciraldo married Kimberly Rendall in October 2007 at St Andrew's Anglican Church in Cronulla.

References

1984 births
Living people
Australian people of Italian descent
Australian rugby league coaches
Australian rugby league players
Central Coast Centurions players
Cronulla-Sutherland Sharks players
Italy national rugby league team coaches
Italy national rugby league team players
Newcastle Knights players
Newtown Jets NSW Cup players
Penrith Panthers coaches
Penrith Panthers players
Rugby league locks
Rugby league players from Sydney
Rugby league second-rows
South Newcastle Lions players
Windsor Wolves players
Canterbury-Bankstown Bulldogs coaches